The 1951 Individual Speedway World Championship was the sixth edition of the official World Championship to determine the world champion rider.

Speedway riders from Sweden, Scotland and Republic of South Africa appeared in the World Championship for the first time. Australia's Jack Young became the first British second division rider to win the World Championship. Young won a run-off for the title with British rider Split Waterman and fellow Australian Jack Biggs after all three riders had finished on 12 points.

The 1951 World Final was held before a reported crowd of 93,000 at Wembley Stadium.

Qualification (Championship Round)

Venues
9 events in Great Britain.

Scores
Top 16 qualify for World final, 17th & 18th reserves for World final

World final
20 September 1951
 London, Wembley Stadium

Classification

Podium
1951 Podium:
   Jack Young (Australia)
   Split Waterman (Great Britain)
   Jack Biggs (Australia)

References

1951
Individual World Championship
Individual Speedway World Championship
Individual Speedway World Championship
Speedway competitions in the United Kingdom